The Megaspilidae are a small hymenopteran family with 13 genera in two subfamilies, and some 450 known species, with a great many species still undescribed. It is a poorly known group as a whole, though most are believed to be parasitoids (especially of sternorrhynchan Hemiptera), and a few hyperparasitoids. Many are found in the soil, and of these, a number are wingless.

The family is distinguished from the closely related Ceraphronidae by having a very large stigma in the wing, a relatively constricted metasomal petiole, and three grooves in the mesoscutum.

The largest genus within Megaspilidae is Dendrocerus. The second largest genus is Conostigmus.

Genera
These 13 genera belong to the family Megaspilidae:

 Aetholagynodes Dessart, 1994 i c g
 Archisynarsis Szabó, 1973 i c g
 Conostigmus Dahlbom, 1858 i c g b
 Creator Alekseev, 1980 i c g
 Dendrocerus Ratzeburg, 1852 i c g b
 Holophleps Kozlov, 1966 i c g
 Lagynodes Förster, 1841 i c g b
 Megaspilus Westwood, 1829 i c g b
 Platyceraphron Kieffer, 1906 i c g
 Prolagynodes Alekseev & Rasnitsyn, 1981 i c g
 Trassedia Cancemi, 1996 i c g
 Trichosteresis Förster, 1856 i c g b
 Typhlolagynodes Dessart, 1981 i c g

Data sources: i = ITIS, c = Catalogue of Life, g = GBIF, b = Bugguide.net

References

External links

Ceraphronoidea